Kuyili (born 14 June 1961) is an Indian actress and dancer who appeared in South Indian films. She also acted in some TV serials. She is famous for the song "Nila Athu Vaanathu Mela" in Kamal Haasan's Nayakan (1987), in which she performed an item number, balancing on a moving boat. The difficult act was applauded by critics.

Filmography

Television

References

External links 
 

Place of birth missing (living people)
Actresses in Tamil cinema
Actresses in Malayalam cinema
Indian film actresses
Living people
Actresses in Kannada cinema
Indian television actresses
20th-century Indian actresses
21st-century Indian actresses
1961 births
Actresses in Tamil television
Actresses in Telugu cinema